Joseph Gardiner may refer to:
 Joseph Gardiner (Western Australian politician) (1886–1965), member of the Western Australian Legislative Assembly
 Joseph Gardiner (New South Wales politician) (1879–1941), member of the New South Wales Legislative Council
 Joe Gardiner, English footballer